WKSY-LD (channel 21) is a low-power independent television station licensed to both Summerville and Trion, Georgia, United States. The station is owned by Gray Television. From its transmitter atop the Mack White Gap east of Summerville, in addition to cable coverage, WKSY-LD covers northwestern Georgia and northeastern Alabama, including Rome, Dalton and Ringgold, Georgia (the latter two are in the Chattanooga market); as well as Fort Payne, Alabama, but is within the Atlanta market.

Previous history
Before Gray acquired the station in 2022, the station carried several subchannels as "Sky 21", including a simulcast of WATC-DT from Atlanta and some local meetings, church services, and event and high school sports programming. Currently the station carries a temporary affiliation with Real America's Voice under agreements made by its previous ownership, and is expected to either become an extended satellite station of Telemundo affiliate WKTB-CD, or a satellite of WANF, WPCH-TV, or another simulcast entirely.

References

External links

KSY-LD
Low-power television stations in the United States
Television channels and stations established in 1987
1987 establishments in Georgia (U.S. state)
Chattooga County, Georgia
Gray Television